The North American F-86 Sabre, sometimes called the Sabrejet, is a transonic jet fighter aircraft. Produced by North American Aviation, the Sabre is best known as the United States' first swept-wing fighter that could counter the swept-wing Soviet MiG-15 in high-speed dogfights in the skies of the Korean War (1950–1953), fighting some of the earliest jet-to-jet battles in history. Considered one of the best and most important fighter aircraft in that war, the F-86 is also rated highly in comparison with fighters of other eras. Although it was developed in the late 1940s and was outdated by the end of the 1950s, the Sabre proved versatile and adaptable and continued as a front-line fighter in numerous air forces.

Its success led to an extended production run of more than 7,800 aircraft between 1949 and 1956, in the United States, Japan, and Italy. In addition, 738 carrier-modified versions were purchased by the US Navy as FJ-2s and -3s. Variants were built in Canada and Australia. The Canadair Sabre added another 1,815 aircraft and the significantly redesigned CAC Sabre (sometimes known as the Avon Sabre or CAC CA-27), had a production run of 112. The Sabre is by far the most-produced Western jet fighter, with a total production of all variants at 9,860 units.

Development

North American Aviation had produced the propeller-powered P-51 Mustang in World War II, which saw combat against some of the first operational jet fighters. By late 1944, North American proposed its first jet fighter to the U.S. Navy, which became the FJ-1 Fury. It was an unexceptional transitional jet fighter that had a straight wing derived from the P-51. Initial proposals to meet a United States Army Air Forces (USAAF) requirement for a medium-range, single-seat, high-altitude, jet-powered day escort fighter/fighter bomber were drafted in mid-1944. In early 1945, North American Aviation submitted four designs. The USAAF selected one design over the others and granted North American a contract to build three examples of the XP-86 ("experimental pursuit"). Despite the gain in speed, early studies revealed the XP-86 would have the same performance as its rivals, the XP-80 and XP-84. Because these rival designs were more advanced in their development stages, it was feared that the XP-86 would be cancelled.

The North American F-86 Sabre was the first American aircraft to take advantage of flight research data seized from the German aerodynamicists at the end of World War II. These data showed that a thin, swept wing could greatly reduce drag and delay compressibility problems that had bedeviled fighters such as the Lockheed P-38 Lightning when approaching the speed of sound. By 1944, German engineers and designers had established the benefits of swept wings based on experimental designs dating back to 1940. A study of the data showed that a swept wing would solve their speed problem, while a slat on the wing's leading edge that extended at low speeds would enhance low-speed stability.

Because development of the XP-86 had reached an advanced stage, the idea of changing the sweep of the wing was met with resistance from some senior North American staff. Despite stiff opposition, after good results were obtained in wind tunnel tests, the swept-wing concept was eventually adopted. Performance requirements were met by incorporating a 35° swept-back wing, using modified NACA four-digit airfoils, NACA 0009.5–64 at the root and NACA 0008.5–64 at the tip, with an automatic slat design based on that of the Messerschmitt Me 262 and an electrically adjustable stabilizer, another feature of the Me 262A. Many Sabres had the "6–3 wing" (a fixed leading edge with a 6-inch extended chord at the root and a 3-inch extended chord at the tip) retrofitted after combat experience was gained in Korea. This modification changed the wing airfoils to the NACA 0009-64 modified configuration at the root and the NACA 0008.1–64 mod at the tip.

The XP-86 prototype, which led to the F-86 Sabre, was rolled out on 8 August 1947. The first flight occurred on 1 October 1947 with George Welch at the controls, flying from Muroc Dry Lake (now Edwards AFB), California.

The United States Air Force's Strategic Air Command had F-86 Sabres in service from 1949 through 1950. The F-86s were assigned to the 22nd Bomb Wing, the 1st Fighter Wing, and the 1st Fighter Interceptor Wing. The F-86 was the primary U.S. air combat fighter during the Korean War, with significant numbers of the first three production models seeing combat.

The F-86 Sabre was also produced under license by Canadair, Ltd, as the Canadair Sabre. The final variant of the Canadian Sabre, the Mark 6, is generally rated as having the highest capabilities of any Sabre version.

Breaking sound barrier and other records

Five years later, on 18 May 1953, Jacqueline Cochran became the first woman to break the sound barrier, flying a "one-off" Canadian-built F-86 Sabre Mk 3, alongside Chuck Yeager. Col. K. K. Compton won the 1951 Bendix air race in an F-86A with an average speed of 553.76 mph (891.19 km/h).

On 2 February 1958, a team of Pakistan Air Force F-86 Sabres called "Falcons" set a world record at  PAF Base Masroor by performing a loop while in a 16 aircraft diamond formation. The team was led by then Wing Commander Zafar Masud.

Design

Overview
The F-86 was produced as both a fighter-interceptor and fighter-bomber. Several variants were introduced over its production life, with improvements and different armament implemented (see below). The XP-86 was fitted with a General Electric J35-C-3 jet engine that produced  of thrust. This engine was built by GM's Chevrolet division until production was turned over to Allison.

Unguided  rockets were used on some fighters on training missions, but  rockets were later carried on combat operations. The F-86 could also be fitted with a pair of external jettisonable jet fuel tanks (four on the F-86F beginning in 1953) that extended the range of the aircraft. Both the interceptor and fighter-bomber versions carried six  M3 Browning machine guns with electrically-boosted feed in the nose (later versions of the F-86H carried four  cannon instead of machine guns). The API rounds used during the Korean War contained magnesium, which were designed to ignite upon impact, but burned poorly above  as oxygen levels were insufficient to sustain combustion at that height. Initial planes were fitted with the Mark 18 manual-ranging computing gun sight. The last 24 F-86A-5-Nas and F-86Es were equipped with the A-1CM gunsight-AN/APG-30 radar, which used radar to automatically compute a target's range, which later proved to be advantageous against MiG opponents over Korea.

Flying characteristics
The Sabre's swept wings and jet engine produced a flying experience that was very different from the propeller-driven fighters of the time. The transition from props to jets was not without accidents and incidents even for experienced fighter pilots. Early on in the jet age, some US manufacturers instituted safety and transition programs where experienced test and production pilots toured operational fighter squadrons to provide instruction and demonstrations designed to lower the accident rate.

Additionally, the ongoing technical development and long production history of the F-86 resulted in some significant differences in the handling and flying characteristics between the various F-86 models. Some of the important changes to the design included the switch from an elevator/stabilizer to an all-flying tail, the discontinuation of leading edge slats for a solid leading edge with increased internal fuel capacity, increased engine power, and an internal missile bay (F-86D). Each of these design changes impacted the handling and flying characteristics of the F-86, not necessarily for the better. In the case of the solid leading edge and increased internal fuel capacity, the design change produced increased combat performance but exacerbated a dangerous and often fatal handling characteristic upon take-off if the nose were raised prematurely from the runway. This 'over-rotation' danger is now a major area of instruction and concern for current F-86 pilots. The 1972 Sacramento Canadair Sabre accident resulting in 22 fatalities and 28 other casualties was a result of over-rotation on take-off.

Operational history

Korean War

The F-86 entered service with the USAF in 1949, joining the 1st Fighter Wing's 94th Fighter Squadron and became the primary air-to-air jet fighter used by the Americans in the Korean War. While earlier straight-winged jets such as the P-80 and F-84 initially achieved air victories, when the swept-wing Soviet MiG-15 was introduced in November 1950, it outperformed all UN-based aircraft. In response, three squadrons of F-86s were rushed to the Far East in December. Early variants of the F-86 could not out-turn MiG-15s, but they could out-dive them. The MiG-15 was superior to early F-86 models in ceiling, acceleration, rate of climb, and zoom. With the introduction of the F-86F in 1953, however, the two aircraft were more closely matched, with many combat-experienced pilots claiming a marginal superiority for the F-86F. The heavier firepower of the MiG (and many other contemporary fighters) was addressed by “Project Gun-Val” which saw the combat testing of seven F-86Fs each armed with four 20 mm T-160 cannons (such F-86s were designated as F-86F-2s). Despite being able to fire only two of the four 20 mm cannon at a time, the experiment was considered a success and signaled the end of the decades-long use of the Browning .50 caliber in the air-to-air role. The MiGs flown from bases in Manchuria by Chinese, North Korean, and Soviet VVS pilots were pitted against two squadrons of the 4th Fighter-Interceptor Wing forward-based at K-14, Kimpo, Korea. In October 1951, the Soviets managed to recover a downed Sabre, and in their investigation of the type they concluded that the Sabre's advantage in combat was due to the APG-30 gun-sight that facilitated accurate fire at longer ranges.

Many of the American pilots were experienced World War II veterans, while the North Koreans and the Chinese lacked combat experience, thus accounting for much of the F-86's success. However, United Nations pilots suspected many of the MiG-15s were being flown by experienced Soviet pilots who also had combat experience in World War II. Former Communist sources now acknowledge Soviet pilots initially flew the majority of MiG-15s that fought in Korea, and dispute that more MiG-15s than F-86s were shot down in air combat. Later in the war, North Korean and Chinese pilots increased their participation as combat flyers. The North Koreans and their allies periodically contested air superiority in MiG Alley, an area near the mouth of the Yalu River (the boundary between Korea and China) over which the most intense air-to-air combat took place. Although the F-86A could be safely flown through Mach 1, the F-86E's all-moving tailplane greatly improved maneuverability at high speeds. The MiG-15 could not safely exceed Mach 0.92, an important disadvantage in near-sonic air combat. Far greater emphasis had been given to the training, aggressiveness, and experience of the F-86 pilots. American Sabre pilots were trained at Nellis, where the casualty rate of their training was so high, they were told, "If you ever see the flag at full staff, take a picture." Despite rules of engagement to the contrary, F-86 units frequently initiated combat over MiG bases in the Manchurian "sanctuary".

The needs of combat operations balanced against the need to maintain an adequate force structure in Western Europe led to the conversion of the 51st Fighter-Interceptor Wing from the F-80 to the F-86 in December 1951. Two fighter-bomber wings, the 8th and 18th, converted to the F-86F in the spring of 1953. No. 2 Squadron, South African Air Force (SAAF) also distinguished itself flying F-86s in Korea as part of the 18 FBW.

On 17 June 1951, at 01:30 hours, Suwon Air Base was bombed by two Polikarpov Po-2 biplanes. Each Po-2 dropped a pair of fragmentation bombs: one scored a hit on the 802nd Engineer Aviation Battalion's motor pool, damaging some equipment. Two bombs burst on the flightline of the 335th Fighter Interceptor Squadron. One F-86A Sabre (FU-334 / 49-1334) was struck on the wing and began burning. The fire took hold, gutting the aircraft. Prompt action by personnel who moved aircraft away from the burning Sabre prevented further loss. Eight other Sabres were damaged in the brief attack, four seriously. One F-86 pilot was among the wounded. The North Koreans subsequently credited Lt. La Woon Yung with this damaging attack.

By the end of hostilities, F-86 pilots were credited with shooting down 792 MiGs for a loss of only 78 Sabres in air-to-air combat, a victory ratio of 10:1. Of the 41 American pilots who earned the designation of ace during the Korean War, all but one flew the F-86 Sabre, the exception being a Navy Vought F4U Corsair night fighter pilot. However, after the war, the USAF reviewed its figures in an investigation code-named Sabre Measure Charlie and downgraded the kill ratio of the North American F-86 Sabre against the Mikoyan-Gurevich MiG-15 by half. Internally, the USAF accepted that its pilots in fact downed ~ 200 MiGs

According to Soviet data, the Soviets lost 335 MiG-15s in Korea to all causes, including accidents, antiaircraft fire, and ground attacks. Chinese claims of their losses amount to 224 MiG-15s in Korea. North Korean losses are not known, but according to North Korean defectors, their air force lost around 100 MiG-15s during the war. Thus, 659 MiG-15s are admitted as being lost, many of these to F-86 Sabres The Soviets claimed to have downed over 600 Sabres, together with the Chinese claims (211 F-86s shot-down), although these cannot be reconciled with the number of Sabres recorded as lost by the US.

The status of many claimed air-to-air victories in the Korean War has been increasingly debated as more data becomes available, showing that instances of over-claiming abounded on both sides. The research by Dorr, Lake and Thompson claimed an F-86 kill ratio closer to 2:1. A recent RAND report made reference to "recent scholarship" of F-86 v MiG-15 combat over Korea and concluded that the actual kill:loss ratio for the F-86 was 1.8:1 overall, and likely closer to 1.3:1 against MiGs flown by Soviet pilots. However, this ratio did not count the number of aircraft of other types (including the B-29, A-26, F-80, F-82, F-84 and Gloster Meteor) shot down by MiG-15 pilots.

Data-matching with Soviet records suggests that US pilots routinely attributed their own combat losses to "landing accidents" and "other causes".  According to official US data ("USAF Statistical Digest FY1953"), the USAF lost 250 F-86 fighters in Korea. Of these, 184 were lost in combat (78 in air-to-air combat, 19 by anti-aircraft guns, 26 were "unknown causes" and 61 were "other losses") and 66 in incidents. South African Air Force lost 6 F-86s in the war. This gives 256 confirmed F-86 losses during the Korean War.

1958 Taiwan Strait crisis 

The Republic of China Air Force of Taiwan was an early recipient of surplus USAF Sabres. From December 1954 to June 1956, the ROC Air Force received 160 ex-USAF F-86F-1-NA through F-86F-30-NA fighters. By June 1958, the Nationalist Chinese had built up an impressive fighter force, with 320 F-86Fs and seven RF-86Fs having been delivered.

Sabres and MiGs were shortly to battle each other in the skies of Asia once again in the Second Taiwan Strait Crisis. In August 1958, the Chinese Communists of the People's Republic of China attempted to force the Nationalists off of the islands of Quemoy and Matsu by shelling and blockade. Nationalist F-86Fs flying combat air patrol over the islands found themselves confronted by Communist MiG-15s and MiG-17s, and numerous dogfights resulted.

During these battles, the Nationalist Sabres introduced a new element into aerial warfare. Under a secret effort designated Operation Black Magic, the U.S. Navy had provided the ROC with the AIM-9 Sidewinder, its first infrared-homing air-to-air missile, which was just entering service with the United States. A small team from VMF-323, a Marine FJ-4 Fury squadron with later assistance from China Lake and North American Aviation, initially modified 20 of the F-86 Sabres to carry a pair of Sidewinders on underwing launch rails and instructed the ROC pilots in their use flying profiles with USAF F-100s simulating the MiG-17. The MiGs enjoyed an altitude advantage over the Sabres, as they had in Korea, and Communist Chinese MiGs routinely cruised over the Nationalist Sabres, only engaging when they had a favorable position. The Sidewinder took away that advantage and proved to be devastatingly effective against the MiGs.

Pakistan Air Force 

In 1954, Pakistan started receiving the first of a total of 102 F-86F Sabres under the Mutual Defense Assistance Program. Many of these aircraft were  F-86F-35s from USAF stocks, but some were from the later F-86F-40-NA production block (made specifically for export). Many of the F−35s were brought up to F−40 standards before they were delivered to Pakistan, but a few remained F−35s. The F-86 was operated by nine Pakistan Air Force (PAF) squadrons at various times: Nos. 5,  11, 14,15, 16, 17, 18, 19, and 26 Squadrons.

Moreover in April 1959, a PAF F-86F flown by Flight Lieutenant Yunis of the No. 15 Squadron "Cobras" shot down an Indian Canberra Spy Plane over Rawalpindi marking the first aerial victory for the Pakistan Air Force.

In 1966, Pakistan accquired 90 Ex-Luftwaffe CL-13 Mk.6s via Iran due to postwar US sanctions. They were known as the F-86E in the PAF. (Not to be confused with the North American F-86E variants)

The last of the Sabres were withdrawn from PAF service in 1980 & were replaced with the Shenyang F-6 fighters. In total Pakistani pilots flew 320,185 hours in the Sabres out of which about 4,500 hours were flown in wartime operations.They are now on display at PAF Museum and various cities around Pakistan.

1960-1961 Bajaur Campaign 

In late 1960, regular and irreguar Afghan forces invaded the Bajaur area of North West Frontier Province in an attempt to anex the region. In response, PAF F-86s were sent into the area to provide Close Air Support for Pakistani Forces and local Pakistani Pashtun tribesmen who were fighting the Afghan infiltrators. The Sabres also executed bombing runs on Royal Afghan Army positions in Kunar which were attacking Frontier Corps border posts.

Indo-Pakistani War of 1965 

The Sabre was no longer a world-class fighter (due to availability of supersonic jets). However, various sources state the F-86 gave the PAF a technological advantage in 1965.

Air to air combat
In the air-to-air combat of the Indo-Pakistani War of 1965, the PAF Sabres claimed to have shot down 15 Indian Air Force (IAF) aircraft, comprising nine Hunters, four Vampires, and two Gnats. India, however, admitted a loss of 14 combat aircraft to the PAF's F-86s. The F-86s of the PAF had the advantage of being armed with AIM-9B/GAR-8 Sidewinder missiles, whereas none of its Indian adversaries had this capability. Despite this, the Indian Air Force claimed that seven F-86 Sabres were shot down by Folland Gnats and six F-86 Sabres were shot down by Hawker Hunters.

Ground attack

The F-86F remained a potent aircraft for use against ground targets. On the morning of 6 September 1965, six F-86s of No. 19 Squadron struck advancing columns of the Indian army using 5-in (127-mm) rockets along with their six .50-in (12.7-mm) M3 Browning machine guns. On the same day, eight F-86 fighters of the same squadron executed airstrikes on the  IAF Pathankot.
In East Pakistan, F-86s from the No. 14 Squadron struck the Indian airbases of Kalaikunda, Bagdogra, Barrackpore & Agartala which resulted in the destruction of more than 20 Indian aircraft. The airstrikes on kalaikunda in particular were highly successful after which the No. 14 Squadron was nicknamed "Tail Choppers".

In total, Pakistani B-57 Canberras and F-86s destroyed around 39 Indian warplanes on the ground at various IAF airbases. However, India claims of losing 22 aircraft on the ground.

1971 Civil conflict and subsequent Indo-Pakistani war 
Air to Air combat

The CL-13B Mk.6 Sabres (known as the F-86E in PAF) were the mainstay of the PAF's day-fighter operations during the 1971 War, and had the challenge of dealing with the threat from IAF Folland Gnats, Hawker Hunters, Sukhoi Su-7s and Mig-21s.

At the beginning of the war, PAF had eight squadrons of F-86 Sabres. Along with the newer fighter types such as the Mirage III and the Shenyang F-6, the Sabres were tasked with the majority of operations during the war. In East Pakistan, PAF's only Tail Choppers squadron was equipped with 16 F-86Es out of which 4 were modified to fire AIM-9/GAR-8 missiles.

In the Battle of Boyra Indian Folland Gnats of 22 Squadron IAF shot down two F-86Es and severely damaged one F-86E.

PAF F-86s performed well, with Pakistani claims of downing 31 Indian aircraft in air-to-air combat. These included 17 Hawker Hunters, eight Sukhoi Su-7 "Fitters", one MiG 21, and three Gnats while losing seven F-86s. The most interesting of these was a battle between two Sabres and four MiG-21s. One MiG was shot down, without any Sabres lost. This was achieved due to the greater low-speed performance of the Sabre in comparison to the delta-winged MiG-21.

India, however, claims to have shot down 11 PAF Sabres for the loss of 11 combat aircraft to the PAF F-86s. The IAF numerical superiority overwhelmed the sole East Pakistan Sabres squadron (and other military aircraft) which were either shot down, or grounded by Pakistani fratricide as they could not hold out, enabling complete air superiority for the IAF.
Ground Attack
In East Pakistan, the F-86Es of the Tail Choppers took active part in several CAS & COIN missions against Mukti Bahini militants & irregular Indian forces.

On 15 April 1971, a formation of 4 Sabres led by Flight Lt. Abbas Khattak strafed and rocketed many rebel strongholds at Bhairab Bazar to support the Pakistan Army's efforts in re-capturing food stocks & silos from the Mukti-Bahini militants.

On 26 April 1971, Flight Lt. Abbass led another Sabre formation at Patuakhali where surviving rebels had regrouped after facing a defeat at Barisal by the hands of the Army. The Sabres struck several rebel strongpoints to soften up resistance after which SSG units were inserted via Mi-8s to clear out the area.

On the Western Front, F-86Es and F-86Fs from various PAF squadrons played a vital role in backing the Pakistan Army's counter attacks at several sectors with Air support.

At Shakargarh & Marala sectors, PAF F-86F/Es from the No. 17, No. 18 & 26 Squadrons alongside Shenyang F-6s took part in air support missions backing Pakistan's I Strike Corps counter attacks against the Indian army's I Corps. Although ill-equipped for anti-tank roles, the Sabres were modified to carry general purpose bombs in an effort to provide as much effective air support as possible.

In the Battle of Chamb, F-86Fs  from the No. 26 Squadron "Black Spiders" and F-86Es from the No. 18 Squadron supported Iftikhar Janjua's forces in capturing Chumb flying 146 air support sorties. At one point, the Indian Army suffered a major blow at Akhnur when sabres from the No. 18 Squadron destroyed their ammunition dumps.

At Sulemanki, F-86Es of the No. 17 Squadron "Tigers" flew 55 CAS sorties in support of the IV Corps offensive in which they claimed 6 Indian tanks and a number of military vehicles destroyed.

At Thar, F-86E & Fs belonging to the No. 19 Squadron struck Indian army positions during their Close Air Support missions. In total, they destroyed 8 Indian Tanks and several military vehicles while also damaging 2 Military trains.

Guinea-Bissau War of Independence
In 1958, the Forca Aerea Portuguesa (FAP) received 50 F-86Fs from ex-USAF stocks. A few former Norwegian Air Force F-86Fs were also purchased as spares in 1968–69.

The FAP deployed some of its F-86F Sabres to Portuguese Guinea in 1961, being based at AB2 – Bissalanca Air Base, Bissau. These aircraft formed "Detachment 52", initially equipped with eight F-86Fs (serials: 5307, 5314, 5322, 5326, 5354, 5356, 5361, and 5362) from the Esquadra 51, based at the BA5 – Monte Real Air Base. These aircraft were used in the Guinea-Bissau War of Independence, in ground-attack and close-support operations against the insurgent forces. In August 1962, 5314 overshot the runway during an emergency landing with bombs still attached on underwing hardpoints and burned out. F-86F 5322 was shot down by enemy ground fire on 31 May 1963; the pilot ejected safely and was recovered. Several other aircraft suffered combat damage but were repaired.

In 1964, 16 F-86Fs based at Bissalanca returned to mainland Portugal due to U.S. pressure. They had flown 577 combat sorties, of which 430 were ground-attack and close-air-support missions.

Philippine Air Force
The Philippine Air Force (PAF) first received the Sabres in the form of F-86Fs in 1957, replacing the North American P-51 Mustang as their
primary interceptor. F-86s first operated from Basa Air Base, known infamously as the "Nest of Vipers", where the 5th Fighter Wing of the PAF was based. Later on, in 1960, the PAF acquired the F-86D as their first all-weather interceptor. The most notable use of the F-86 Sabres was in the Blue Diamonds aerobatic display team, which operated eight Sabres until the arrival of the newer, supersonic Northrop F-5. The F-86s were subsequently phased out of service in the 1970s as the  Northrop F-5 Freedom Fighter and Vought F-8 Crusaders became the primary fighters and interceptors of the PAF.  Antonio Bautista was a Blue Diamonds pilot and a decorated officer. He was killed on 11 January 1974 during a combat sortie against rebels in the south of the country.

Soviet Sabre
During the Korean War, the Soviets were searching for an intact U.S. F-86 Sabre for evaluation/study purposes. Their search was frustrated, largely due to the U.S. military's policy of destroying their weapons and equipment once they had been disabled or abandoned;  in the case of U.S. aircraft, USAF pilots destroyed most of their downed Sabres by strafing or bombing them. However, on one occasion, an F-86 was downed in the tidal area of a beach and subsequently was submerged, preventing its destruction. The aircraft was ferried to Moscow and a new OKB (Soviet Experimental Design Bureau) was established to study the F-86, which later became part of the Sukhoi OKB. "At least one F-86… was sent to the Soviet Union, the  admitted, and other planes and prizes such as U.S. G-suits and radar gun sights also went." The Soviets studied and copied the optical gunsight and radar from the captured aircraft to produce the ASP-4N gunsight and SRC-3 radar. Installed in the MiG-17, the gunsight system was later used against American fighters in the Vietnam War. The F-86 studies also contributed to the development of aircraft aluminum alloys such as V-95.

Feather Duster 
The old but nimble MiG-17 had become such a serious threat against the Republic F-105 Thunderchief over North Vietnam that the USAF created project "Feather Duster" to test which tactics supersonic American fighters could use against fighters such as the MiG-17. ANG F-86H units proved to be an ideal stand-in for the Soviet jets. One pilot remarked, "In any envelope except nose down and full throttle", either the F-100 or F-105 was inferior to the F-86H in a dogfight.

Variants

North American F-86

XF-86 three prototypes, originally designated XP-86, North American model NA-140
YF-86A this was the first prototype fitted with a General Electric J47 turbojet engine.
F-86A 554 built, North American model NA-151 (F-86A-1 block and first order of A-5 block) and NA-161 (second F-86A-5 block)
DF-86A A few F-86A conversions as drone directors
RF-86A 11 F-86A conversions with three cameras for reconnaissance
F-86B 188 ordered as upgraded A-model with wider fuselage and larger tires but delivered as F-86A-5, North American model NA-152
F-86C Original designation for the YF-93A, two built, 48–317 & 48–318, order for 118 cancelled, North American model NA-157
YF-95A Prototype all-weather interceptor, two built, designation changed to YF-86D, North American model NA-164
F-86D/LProduction transonic all-weather search-radar equipped interceptor originally designated F-95A, 2,506 built. The F-86D had only 25 percent commonality with other Sabre variants, with a larger fuselage, larger afterburning engine, and a distinctive nose radome. Sole armament was Mk. 4 unguided rockets instead of machine guns. F-86Ls were upgraded F-86Ds.
F-86E Improved flight control system and an "all-flying tail" (This system changed to a full power-operated control with an "artificial feel" built into the aircraft's controls to give the pilot forces on the stick that were still conventional, but light enough for superior combat control. It improved high-speed maneuverability); 456 built, North American model NA-170 (F-86E-1 and E-5 blocks), NA-172, essentially the F-86F airframe with the F-86E engine (F-86E-10 and E-15 blocks); 60 of these built by Canadair for USAF (F-86E-6)
F-86E(M) Designation for ex-RAF Sabres diverted to other NATO air forces
QF-86E Designation for surplus RCAF Sabre Mk. Vs modified to target drones
F-86F Uprated engine and larger "6–3" wing without leading-edge slats, 2,239 built; North American model NA-172 (F-86F-1 through F-15 blocks), NA-176 (F-86F-20 and −25 blocks), NA-191 (F-86F-30 and −35 blocks), NA-193 (F-86F-26 block), NA-202 (F-86F-35 block), NA-227 (first two orders of F-86F-40 blocks comprising 280 aircraft that reverted to leading-edge wing slats of an improved design), NA-231 (70 in third F-40 block order), NA-238 (110 in fourth F-40 block order), and NA-256 (120 in final F-40 block order); 300 additional aircraft in this series assembled by Mitsubishi in Japan for Japanese Air Self-Defense Force. The F-35 block had provisions for a new operational role: the tactical nuclear attack utilizing newer, smaller, and lighter nuclear weapons ("second generation" nuclear ordnance). The USAF upgraded many previous F versions to the F-40 standard. One E and two Fs were modified for improved performance via rocket boost.
F-86F-2 Designation for 10 aircraft modified to carry the M39 cannon in place of the M3 .50 caliber machine gun "six-pack". Four F-86E-10s (serial numbers 51-2803, 2819, 2826 and 2836) and six F-86F-1s (serial numbers 51-2855, 2861, 2867, 2868, 2884 and 2900) were production-line aircraft modified in October 1952 with enlarged and strengthened gun bays, then flight tested at Edwards Air Force Base and the Air Proving Ground at Eglin Air Force Base in November. Eight were shipped to Japan in December and seven forward-deployed to Kimpo Airfield as "Project GunVal" for a 16-week combat field trial in early 1953. Two were lost to engine compressor stalls after ingesting excessive propellant gases from the cannons.
QF-86F About 50 former Japan Self-Defense Forces (JASDF) F-86F aircraft converted to drones for use as targets by the U.S. Navy
RF-86F Some F-86F-30s converted with three cameras for reconnaissance; also 18 Japan Self-Defense Forces (JASDF) aircraft similarly converted
TF-86F Two F-86F converted to two-seat training configuration with lengthened fuselage and slatted wings under North American model NA-204
YF-86H Extensively redesigned fighter-bomber model with deeper fuselage, uprated engine, longer wings and power-boosted tailplane, two built as North American model NA-187
F-86H Production model, 473 built, with Low Altitude Bombing System (LABS) and provision for nuclear weapon, North American model NA-187 (F-86H-1 and H-5 blocks) and NA-203 (F-86H-10 block)
QF-86H Target conversion of 29 aircraft for use at United States Naval Weapons Center
F-86J Single F-86A-5-NA, 49-1069, flown with Orenda turbojet under North American model NA-167 – same designation reserved for A-models flown with the Canadian engines but project not proceeded with
F-86K
F-86L

North American FJ Fury
 See: North American FJ-2/-3 Fury for production figures of U.S. Navy versions.

CAC Sabre (Australia)

Two types based on the U.S. F-86F were built under licence by the Commonwealth Aircraft Corporation (CAC) in Australia, for the Royal Australian Air Force as the CA-26 (one prototype) and CA-27 (production variant). The RAAF operated the CA-27 from 1956 to 1971. The CAC Sabres included a 60% fuselage redesign, to accommodate the Rolls-Royce Avon Mk 26 engine, which had roughly 50% more thrust than the J47, as well as 30 mm Aden cannon and AIM-9 Sidewinder missiles. As a consequence of its powerplant, the Australian-built Sabres are commonly referred to as the Avon Sabre. CAC manufactured 112 of these aircraft. Ex-RAAF Avon Sabres were operated by the Royal Malaysian Air Force (TUDM) between 1969 and 1972. From 1973 to 1975, 23 Avon Sabres were donated to the Indonesian Air Force (TNI-AU); five of these were ex-Malaysian aircraft.

CA-27 marques:
Mk 30: 21 built, wing slats, Avon 20 engine.
Mk 31: 21 built, 6–3 wing, Avon 20 engine.
Mk 32: 69 built, four wing pylons, F-86F fuel capacity, Avon 26 engine.

Canadair Sabre

The F-86 was also manufactured by Canadair in Canada as the CL-13 Sabre to replace its de Havilland Vampires, with the following production models:
Sabre Mk 1 one built, prototype F-86A
Sabre Mk 2 350 built, F-86E-type, 60 to USAF, three to RAF, 287 to RCAF
Sabre Mk 3 one built in Canada, test-bed for the Orenda jet engine
Sabre Mk 4 438 built, production Mk 3, 10 to RCAF, 428 to RAF as Sabre F-4
Sabre Mk 5 370 built, F-86F-type with Orenda engine, 295 to RCAF, 75 to Luftwaffe
Sabre Mk 6 655 built, 390 to RCAF, 225 to Luftwaffe, six to Colombia and 34 to South Africa

Production summary

 NAA built a total of 6,297 F-86s and 1,115 FJs,
 Canadair built 1,815,
 Australian CAC built 112,
 Fiat built 221, and
 Mitsubishi built 300;
 for a total Sabre/Fury production of 9,860.

Production costs

Note: The costs are in approximately 1950 United States dollars and have not been adjusted for inflation.

Operators

 Source: F-86 Sabre Jet: History of the Sabre and FJ Fury

 Argentine Air Force
 Acquired 28 F-86Fs, 26 September 1960, FAA s/n CA-101 through CA-128. The Sabres were already on reserve status at the time of the Falklands War but were reinstated to active service to bolster air defences against possible Chilean involvement. Finally retired in 1986.

 Royal Australian Air Force

 Bangladesh Air Force
 8 F-86F-40-NAs captured from Pakistan, phased out.

 Belgian Air Force
 5 F-86F Sabres delivered, no operational unit.

 Bolivian Air Force

 Royal Canadian Air Force (RCAF)

 Colombian Air Force
 Acquired four F-86Fs from Spanish Air Force (s/n 2027/2028), five USAF F-86F (s/n 51-13226) and other nine Canadair Mk.6; assigned to Escuadron de Caza-Bombardero.

Royal Danish Air Force
 59 F-86D-31NA(38) F-86D-36NA(21)s in service from 1958 – 1966 ESK 723, ESK 726, ESK 728

 Ethiopian Air Force
 Acquired 14 F-86Fs in 1960.

 German Air Force (Luftwaffe)  – see North American F-86D Sabre and Canadair Sabre

 Honduran Air Force
 Acquired and 10 CL.13 Mk2 (F-86E) from Yugoslavia.

 Imperial Iranian Air Force
 Acquired an unknown number of F-86Fs.

 Iraqi Air Force
Bought some units of the type but they were never operated and were returned.

 Japanese Air Self-Defense Force (JASDF)
 Acquired 180 U.S. F-86Fs, 1955–1957. Mitsubishi built 300 F-86Fs under license 1956–1961, and were assigned to 10 fighter hikōtai or squadrons. JASDF called F-86F the "Kyokukō" (旭光, Rising Sunbeam) and F-86D the "Gekkō" (月光, Moon Light). Their Blue Impulse Aerobatic Team, a total of 18 F-models were converted to reconnaissance version in 1962. Some aircraft were returned to the Naval Air Weapons Station China Lake, California, as drones.

 Royal Norwegian Air Force
 Acquired 115 F-86Fs, 1957–1958; and assigned to seven squadrons, Nos. 331, 332, 334, 336, 337, 338 and 339.

 Pakistani Air Force
 Acquired 102 U.S.-built F-86F-35-NA and F-86F-40-NAs, last of North American Aviation's production line, 1954–1960s.

 Peruvian Air Force
 Acquired 26 U.S.-built F-86Fs in 1955, assigned to Escuadrón Aéreo 111, Grupo Aéreo No.11 at Talara air force base. Finally retired in 1979.

 Philippine Air Force
 Acquired 50 F-86Fs in 1957. Retired in the late 1970s.

 Portuguese Air Force
 A total of 65 acquired: 50 U.S.-built F-86Fs, 1958, including some from USAF's 531st Fighter Bomber Squadron, Chambley and 15 ex-Royal Norwegian Air Force. In Portugal, they served in Squadron 201 (formerly designated as Sqn. 50 and later Sqn. 51, before being renamed in 1978) and Squadron 52, both based at Air Base No. 5, Monte Real. In 1961, the Portuguese Air Force deployed some of its F-86Fs to Portuguese Guinea, where they formed Detachment 52, based at Base-Aerodrome No. 2, Bissalanca/Bissau.

 Republic of China Air Force
 Acquired 320 U.S.-built F-86Fs,7 RF-86Fs,18 F-86Ds, The 18 F-86Ds back to U.S. military and US send 6 to Republic of Korea Air Force,8 to Philippine Air Force in 1966.

 Royal Saudi Air Force
 Acquired 16 U.S.-built F-86Fs in 1958, and three Fs from Norway in 1966; and assigned to RSAF No. 7 Squadron at Dhahran.

 South African Air Force
 Acquired on loan 22 U.S.-built F-86F-30s during the Korean War and saw action with 2 Squadron SAAF.

 Republic of Korea Air Force
 Acquired U.S.-built 112 F-86Fs and 10 RF-86Fs, beginning 20 June 1955; and assigned to ROKAF 10th Wing. It also served with the ROKAF Black Eagles aerobatic team for annual event from 1959 to 1966. The last F-86s retired in 1990.

 Spanish Air Force
 Acquired 270 U.S.-built F-86Fs, 1955–1958; designated C.5s and assigned to 5 wings: Ala de Caza 1, 2, 4, 5, and 6. Retired 1972.

 Royal Thai Air Force
 Acquired 40 U.S.-built F-86Fs, 1962; assigned to RTAF Squadrons, Nos. 12 (Ls), 13, and 43.

 Tunisian Air Force
 Acquired 15 used U.S.-built F-86F in 1969.

 Turkish Air Force
 Acquired ex-RCAF 107 Canadair CL-13 Sabre Mk.2 “F-86E(M)„ in 1954, retired 1968.

 United Nations Operation in the Congo
 Received 5 F-86E(M)s from Italy as MAP redeployment 1963, manned by Philippine pilots; F-86F units from Ethiopia and Iran also used in ONUC.

 United States Air Force

 Venezuelan Air Force
 Acquired 30 U.S.-built F-86Fs, October 1955 – December 1960; and assigned to one group, Grupo Aéreo De Caza No. 12, three other squadrons.

 Yugoslav Air Force
 Acquired 121 Canadair CL-13s and F-86Es, operating them in several fighter aviation regiments between 1956 and 1971.

Civil aviation
According to the FAA there are 50 privately owned and registered F-86s in the US, including Canadair CL-13 Sabres.

Notable pilots
 Sqn Ldr (later Air commodore) M. M. Alam, Pakistan Air Force, became a flying ace by shooting down five Indian Air Force fighters within one minute in the Indo-Pakistani War of 1965. He was awarded the Sitara-e-Jurat ("The star of courage") and bar.
 Colonel Edwin "Buzz" Aldrin, USAF test pilot and NASA astronaut of Apollo 11 fame. Credited with shooting down two MiGs over Korea.
 Major Rudolf Anderson, Jr. USAF (4028th Strategic Reconnaissance Squadron). Shot down and killed in 1962 while flying a U-2 spy plane over Cuba during the Cuban Missile Crisis.
 Colonel Royal N. Baker (13 victories), commander USAF 4 FIW.
 Wing Commander John Robert Baldwin DSO & Bar, DFC & Bar, AFC was a Royal Air Force fighter pilot and the top scoring fighter ace flying the Hawker Typhoon exclusively during the Second World War. He was posted missing, presumed killed, during service with the United States Air Force in the Korean War flying a Sabre.
 Lieutenant Colonel Antonio Bautista of the Philippine Air Force received the Distinguished Conduct Star for his valor and bravery in providing close air support to ground forces.
 Major General Frederick C. Blesse (10 victories)
 Major (later Lt Col) John F. Bolt, US Marine Corps, 6 victories while on exchange duty with the 39th FS, 51st FG, previously 6 victories in World War II and the only Marine to become an ace in two wars.
 1st Lieutenant [Later Colonel] John Boyd, USAF, flying 22 missions in the F-86E and F models, with the 25th FIS (51st FIW) June–July 1953. 
 1st Lieutenant John M. Conroy, completed "Operation Boomerang" on 21 May 1955, a record-setting coast-to-coast and back in one day during daylight hours of 5058 miles in 11 hours, 26 mins, 33 secs.
 Major George Davis (14 victories), USAF 4 FIW, awarded the Medal of Honor posthumously
 Lieutenant Commander Theodore H Faller, 13 August 1979 – U.S. Navy Lieutenant Commander Theodore "Ted" Faller was killed when his QF-86 Sabre suffered an engine failure moments after takeoff. Faller managed to bring the stricken aircraft down in a vacant lot 600 yards south of the Ridgecrest Heights Elementary School, later renamed Theodore Faller Elementary School.
 Captain Manuel "Pete" Fernandez, (14.5 victories), USAF 4 FIW
 Colonel Francis S. "Gabby" Gabreski (six and one-half victories), USAF 51 FIW commander, top European U.S. ace in World War II
 Colonel Vermont Garrison (five victories), USAF 4 FIW, ace in World War II and combat veteran of three wars
 Colonel Ralph "Hoot" Gibson (five victories), USAF 4 FIW
 Major John Glenn, a U.S. Marine Corps exchange pilot with the USAF 51 FIW (3 victories). First American astronaut to orbit the Earth, later a U.S. Senator from Ohio.
 Lieutenant Colonel Virgil "Gus" Grissom, astronaut in the Mercury, Gemini and Apollo programs, died in a fire during testing for the Apollo 1 mission.
 Major (later Colonel) James P. Hagerstrom, (8 1/2 victories) World War II ace.
 1st Lieutenant Robert A. "Bob" Hoover, USAF 52 FIW, North American Aviation experimental engineering test pilot.
 Captain James Horowitz (1 victory), USAF 4 FIW, novelist and author of The Hunters under the pen name James Salter
 Colonel James Jabara (15 victories), USAF 4 FIW
 Colonel James H. Kasler (six victories), USAF 4 FIW and only three-time recipient of the Air Force Cross
 Captain Iven Kincheloe (five victories) USAF 51 FIW, test pilot selected to fly the North American X-15
 Second Lieutenant Gene Kranz, NASA flight director for Gemini and Apollo and assistant flight director on Project Mercury- flew with 69th FBS in South Korea
 1st Lt (later Major) James F. Low, only Korean War USAF pilot to reach ace status while still a 2nd Lt; inspiration for the character of 2nd Lt Ed Pell in the novel and movie The Hunters by James Horowitz (a.k.a. James Salter); later a Vietnam War POW 
 Squadron Leader Andy Mackenzie, DFC. RCAF Second World War fighter ace (8.5 victories); taken POW when his F-86 was shot down while flying with the USAF 51 FIW in Korea in 1952.
 Colonel Walker "Bud" Mahurin, USAF 4 FIG commander and World War II ace
 Major General Howard Thomas Markey, first chief judge of the United States Court of Appeals for the Federal Circuit
 Captain Joseph C. McConnell (16 victories), USAF 51 FIW, who later died in a crash at Edwards Air Force Base testing the F-86H
 Colonel (later General) John C. Meyer (two victories), USAF 4 FIW commander, World War II ace, and later Vice Chief of Staff of the USAF.
 Squadron Leader Sarfaraz Ahmed Rafiqui (two victories), Officer Commanding of PAF's No. 5 Squadron, awarded the Hilal-i-Jur'at and later KIA during the Indo-Pakistani War of 1965.
 Brigadier General James Robinson Risner (eight victories), USAF awarded the Air Force Cross, later Vietnam War POW
 Colonel Harrison R. Thyng (five victories), USAF 4 FIW commander
 Major (later Colonel) William T. Whisner Jr. (5 1/2 victories), World War II ace

Surviving aircraft

Specifications (F-86F-40-NA)

See also

References

Notes

Citations

Bibliography
 Allward, Maurice. F-86 Sabre. London: Ian Allan, 1978. .

 
 
 Curtis, Duncan. North American F-86 Sabre. Ramsbury, UK: Crowood, 2000. .
 Davies, Peter. USN F-4 Phantom II vs VPAF MiG-17: Vietnam 1965–72. Oxford, UK: Oxford, 2009. .
 Dorr, Robert F. F-86 Sabre Jet: History of the Sabre and FJ Fury. St. Paul, Minnesota: Motorbooks International Publishers, 1993. .
 Futrell, Robert F. The United States Air Force in Korea, 1950-1953. Air Force History and Museums Program, 2000. .
 Dunlap, Roy F. Ordnance Went Up Front. Plantersville, South Carolina: Samworth Press, 1948.

 Hoover, R.A. Forever Flying: Fifty Years of High-Flying Adventures, From Barnstorming in Prop Planes to Dogfighting Germans to Testing Supersonic Jets: An Autobiography. New York: Pocket Books, 1997. .
 Jenkins, Dennis R. and Tony R. Landis. Experimental & Prototype U.S. Air Force Jet Fighters. North Branch, Minnesota, USA: Specialty Press, 2008. .
 Joos, Gerhard W. Canadair Sabre Mk 1–6, Commonwealth Sabre Mk 30–32 in RCAF, RAF, RAAF, SAAF, Luftwaffe & Foreign Service. Kent, UK: Osprey Publications Limited, 1971. .
 Käsmann, Ferdinand C.W. Die schnellsten Jets der Welt: Weltrekord- Flugzeuge (in German). Oberhaching, Germany: Aviatic Verlag-GmbH, 1994. .
 Knaack, Marcelle Size. Encyclopedia of US Air Force Aircraft and Missile Systems, Volume 1, Post-World War Two Fighters, 1945–1973. Washington, DC: Office of Air Force History, 1978. .
 Leyes, Richard A. and William A. Fleming. The History of North American Small Gas Turbine Aircraft Engines.  (Library of Flight Series) Washington, D.C.: AIAA, 1999. .
 Michel, Marshall L., III. Clashes: Air Combat Over North Vietnam, 1965–1972. Annapolis, Maryland: Naval Institute Press, 2007. .
 Radinger, Willy and Walter Schick. Me 262: Entwicklung und Erprobung des ertsen einsatzfähigen Düsenjäger der Welt, Messerschmitt Stiftung (in German). Berlin: Avantic Verlag GmbH, 1996. .
 Robinson, Robbie NATO F-86D/K Sabre Dogs 120 p. Le Havre, France: Editions Minimonde76, 2018. . 
 Schrøder, Hans. Royal Danish Airforce. Copenhagen, Denmark: Tøjhusmuseet, 1991. .
 Singh, Sarina et al. Pakistan & the Karakoram Highway. London: Lonely Planet Publications, 2004. .
 Swanborough, F. Gordon. United States Military Aircraft Since 1909. London: Putnam, 1963. .
 Thompson, Warren E. and David R. McLaren. MiG Alley: Sabres vs. MiGs Over Korea. North Branch, Minnesota: Specialty Press, 2002. .
 United States Air Force Museum Guidebook. Wright-Patterson AFB, Dayton, Ohio: Air Force Museum Foundation, 1975.
 Wagner, Ray. American Combat Planes – Second Edition. New York: Doubleday and Company, 1968. .
 Wagner, Ray. The North American Sabre. London: Macdonald, 1963. No ISBN.
 
 Westrum, Ron. Sidewinder. Annapolis, Maryland: Naval Institute Press, 1999. .
 
 
 Winchester, Jim, ed. Military Aircraft of the Cold War (The Aviation Factfile). London: Grange Books plc, 2006. .

External links

 F-86 Sabre Pilots Association
 Four-part series about the F-86 Sabre – Extended F-86 Sabre article set
 Warbird Alley: F-86 Sabre page – Information about F-86s still flying today
 Sabre site
 F-86 in Joe Baugher's U.S. aircraft site

F-086 Sabre
1940s United States fighter aircraft
Single-engined jet aircraft
Low-wing aircraft
 
Aircraft first flown in 1947